Stone Metal Fire, known in Thai as Hin Lek Fai and stylized as SMF, is a Thai rock band famous and popular especially in the 1990s.

History
The band formed in 1993 by Pathompong "Pong" Sombatpiboon (โป่ง: ปฐมพงษ์ สมบัติพิบูลย์) former lead vocalist of Thai rock band pioneer, The Olarn Project and highly skilled guitarist Chakrarin "Pop" Daungmaneerattanachai (ป๊อป: จักรรินทร์ ดวงมณีรัตนชัย).

The first studio album release in January 1993, sold over a million copies. This is the first Thai rock band to do this, later the band played in the Short Charge Shock Rock Concert  with Hi-Rock and Rang Rockestra at Indoor Stadium Huamark, there were tens of thousands of spectators. It was the most popular concert by Thai artists in 1993, and the concert of the same name was held twice in a row in 1994 and 1995 at Thai Army Sports Stadium.

Stone Metal Fire has released one studio album in 1995. Later, the band changed its name to The Sun and released two studio albums in 1997 and 2000.

Members
Current members
Pathompong "Pong" Sombatpiboon (โป่ง: ปฐมพงษ์ สมบัติพิบูลย์): Lead vocalist and Songwriter
Chakrarin "Pop" Daungmaneerattanachai (ป๊อป: จักรรินทร์ ดวงมณีรัตนชัย): Guitar
Nampol "To" Raksapong (โต: นำพล รักษาพงษ์): Guitar
Narong "Rong" Sirisarnsoonthorn (รงค์: ณรงค์ ศิริสารสุนทร): Bass
Damrongsith "Pingpong" Srinak (ปิงปอง: ดำรงสิทธิ์ ศรีนาค): Drums
Prateep "Moo" Vorapat (หมู: ประทีป วรภัทร): Keyboards
Past members
Samann "Mann" Yuanpeng (หมาน: สมาน ยวนเพ็ง): Drums (only first studio album)
Selvester Lester C. Esteban: Drums (only second studio album)

Discography
หิน เหล็ก ไฟ (Hin Lek Fai; March 1993)
ร็อกเพื่อนกัน (Rock Peurn Kun; 1993; special)
คนยุคเหล็ก (Khon Yuk Lek; midyear 1995)
Never Say Die (2005)
Acoustique (2006; special)

Concert
May 29, 1993, Short Charge Shock Rock Concert. At Indoor Stadium Huamark
May 13, 1995, Short Charge Shock Rock Concert : Lek Kumram. At Thai Army Sports Stadium
August 29, 2003, Intellectual Property Concert. At Suan Lum Night Bazaar
April 30, 2005, Trilogy Rock Concert. At Impact, Muang Thong Thani
September 10, 2005, SMF Meeting Concert. At AUA Language Center Auditorium
August 17, 2013, Short Charge Shock Rock Legend. At Impact, Muang  Thong Thani.

References

External links
 

Thai heavy metal musical groups
Musical groups established in 1993
Musical groups from Bangkok